The Hilton Central School District (HCSD) is a public school district in New York State that serves approximately 4,500 students in the village of Hilton and the towns of Clarkson, Greece, Hamlin and Parma in Monroe County, with over 800 full and part-time employees and an operating budget of $81 million.

The average class size is 20-25(K-6), 20-26(6-12) students and the student-teacher ratio is 12:1.

Dr. Casey Kosiorek is the Superintendent of Schools.

The Board of Education
(BOE) consists of 7 members who serve rotating 3-year terms. Elections are held each May for board members and to vote on the School District Budget.

Current board members are: 
Mark Hilburger - President
Ed Mascadri - Vice President
Brian O'Connor
Nancy Pickering
Maryanne Chaffee
Therese Flannery
Stephanie Sloan

District Leadership
Dr. Casey Kosiorek, Superintendent
Adam Geist, Assistant Superintendent for Business
Stephen "Ned" Dale, Assistant Superintendent for Human Resources
Dr. Barbara Surash, Assistant Superintendent for Instruction

Schools

Elementary schools
Northwood Elementary School (Pre-K-6), Interim Principal - Carol Stehm, Interim Assistant Principal - Melissa Perkowski
Quest Elementary School (Pre-K-6), Principal - Derek Warren, IB Specialist - Andrea Geglia
Village Elementary School (Pre-K-6), Principal - Dr. Benjamin Rudd, Assistant Principal - Lora Bower

Middle school
Merton Williams Middle School (7-8), Principal - Marc D'Amico, Assistant Principal - Laura Mayer

High school
Hilton High School (9-12), Principal - Dr. Jeffrey Green, Assistant Principals - Michael LeGault, Carol Saladzius and Erin Schneider

Performance
The New York State Education Department named the District a "High Performing School District."

The Hilton Central School District is the first in New York State to offer the International Baccalaureate Programme (IB) across all grade levels. Hilton High School, recognized as one of the nation's top high schools by U.S. News & World Report in 2012, offers an International Baccalaureate Diploma.

References

External links
Hilton Central School District Website
Hilton School History
New York State School Boards Association

School districts in New York (state)
Education in Monroe County, New York
School districts established in 1930